Filipo Daugunu (born 4 March 1995) is a rugby union player who plays for the Queensland Reds in the Super Rugby competition. His position of choice is wing. Fijian-born, Daugunu moved to Australia in 2016 at the age of 20 to pursue a professional sporting career.

Early career
Daugunu started his sporting career playing football for his local district football team, Labasa Football. He played both as a goalkeeper and a striker, and became a regular in the Labasa team in 2013.

In 2015, Daugunu gave up an association football career to play rugby union, representing Fiji Under-20 at the World Rugby Junior Trophy in Portugal. He was involved with the Fiji 7s program in 2016, but opted out of joining the team to play on the world circuit. He moved to Brisbane, Australia and began playing club rugby there.

Daugunu gained significant attention in Queensland Premier Rugby after scoring sixty-six points from eleven appearances for Wests Bulldogs in 2017. After helping Wests to their first finals appearance in ten years, losing 24–22 to Sunnybank in the semi-finals, he was recruited to play in the National Rugby Championship (NRC) for Queensland Country.

Daugunu scored seventy-one points in just eight appearances for Queensland Country on the way to club's first national title. He scored a hat-trick in the final against the Canberra Vikings which was instrumental to Country's 42–28 win.

Super Rugby
Because of his performances in the NRC, the Queensland Reds signed him in late 2017 to join their squad for the 2018 Super Rugby season.

International tries 
As of 20 November 2021

Super Rugby statistics

References 

1995 births
Australian rugby union players
Australia international rugby union players
Fijian rugby union players
Living people
Rugby union wings
Queensland Country (NRC team) players
Queensland Reds players